The Christian left is a range of Christian political and social movements that largely embrace social justice principles and uphold a social doctrine or social gospel. Given the inherent diversity in international political thought, the term Christian left can have different meanings and applications in different countries. While there is much overlap, the Christian left is distinct from liberal Christianity, meaning not all Christian leftists are liberal Christians and vice versa.

In the United States, the Christian left usually aligns with modern liberalism and progressivism, using the social gospel to achieve better social and economic equality. Christian anarchism, Christian communism, and Christian socialism are subsets of the socialist Christian left. Karl Marx and Friedrich Engels, authors of the Communist Manifesto, both had Christian upbringings.

Terminology 

As with any section within the left–right political spectrum, a label such as Christian left represents an approximation, including within it groups and persons holding many diverse viewpoints. The term left-wing might encompass a number of values, some of which may or may not be held by different Christian movements and individuals. As the unofficial title of a loose association of believers, it provides a clear distinction from the more commonly known Christian right, or religious right, and from its key leaders and political views.

The most common religious viewpoint that might be described as left-wing is social justice, or care for impoverished and oppressed minority groups. Supporters of this trend might encourage universal health care, welfare provisions, subsidized education, foreign aid, and affirmative action for improving the conditions of the disadvantaged. With values stemming from egalitarianism, adherents of the Christian left consider it part of their religious duty to take actions on behalf of the oppressed. Matthew 25:31–46, among other verses, is often cited to support this view. As nearly all major religions contain some kind of requirement to help others, adherents of various religions have cited social justice as a movement in line with their faith.

The term social justice was coined in the 1840s by Luigi Taparelli, an Italian Catholic scholar of the Society of Jesus, who was inspired by the writings of Thomas Aquinas. The Christian left holds that social justice, renunciation of power, humility, forgiveness, and private observation of prayer (as in ) as opposed to publicly mandated prayer, are mandated by the Gospel. The Bible contains accounts of Jesus repeatedly advocating for the poor and outcast over the wealthy, powerful, and religious. The Christian left maintains that such a stance is relevant and important. Adhering to the standard of "turning the other cheek", which they believe supersedes the Old Testament law of "an eye for an eye", the Christian left sometimes hearkens towards pacifism in opposition to policies advancing militarism.

Some among the Christian left, as well as some non-religious socialists, find support for anarchism, communism, and socialism in the Gospels, for example Mikhail Gorbachev citing Jesus as "the first socialist". The Christian left is a broad category that includes Christian socialism, as well as Christians who would not identify themselves as socialists.

History

Early years 

For much of the early history of anti-establishment leftist movements, such as socialism and communism, which was highly anti-clerical in the 19th century, some established churches were led by clergy who saw revolution as a threat to their status and power. The church was sometimes seen as part of the establishment. Revolutions in the United States, France and Russia were in part directed against the established churches, or rather their leading clergy, and instituted a separation of church and state.

In the 19th century, some writers and activists developed the school of thought of Christian socialism, which infused socialist principles into Christian theology and praxis. Early socialist thinkers such as Robert Owen, Henri de Saint-Simon based their theories of socialism upon Christian principles. Karl Marx and Friedrich Engels reacted against these theories by formulating a secular theory of socialism in The Communist Manifesto.

Alliance of the left and Christianity 
Starting in the late 19th century and early 20th century, some began to take on the view that genuine Christianity had much in common with a leftist perspective. From St. Augustine of Hippo's City of God through St. Thomas More's Utopia, major Christian writers had expounded upon views that socialists found agreeable. Of major interest was the extremely strong thread of egalitarianism in the New Testament. Other common leftist concerns such as pacifism, social justice, racial equality, human rights, and the rejection of excessive wealth are also expressed strongly in the Bible. In the late 19th century, the Social Gospel movement arose (particularly among some Anglicans, Lutherans, Methodists and Baptists in North America and Britain,) which attempted to integrate progressive and socialist thought with Christianity to produce a faith-based social activism, promoted by movements such as Christian socialism. In the United States during this period, Episcopalians and Congregationalists generally tended to be the most liberal, both in theological interpretation and in their adherence to the Social Gospel. In Canada, a coalition of liberal Congregationalists, Methodists, and Presbyterians founded the United Church of Canada, one of the first true Christian left denominations. Later in the 20th century, liberation theology was championed by such writers as Gustavo Gutierrez and Matthew Fox.

Christians and workers 
To a significant degree, the Christian left developed out of the experiences of clergy who went to do pastoral work among the working class, often beginning without any social philosophy but simply a pastoral and evangelistic concern for workers. This was particularly true among the Methodists and Anglo-Catholics in England, Father Adolph Kolping in Germany and Joseph Cardijn in Belgium.

Christian left and campaigns for peace and human rights 

Some Christian groups were closely associated with the peace movements against the Vietnam War as well as the 2003 Invasion of Iraq. Religious leaders in many countries have also been on the forefront of criticizing any cuts to social welfare programs. In addition, many prominent civil rights activists were religious figures.

In the United States 
In the United States, members of the Christian Left come from a spectrum of denominations: Peace churches, elements of the Protestant mainline churches, Catholicism, and some evangelicals.

Martin Luther King Jr. 

Martin Luther King Jr. was an American Baptist minister and activist who became the most visible spokesman and leader in the civil rights movement from 1955 until his assassination in 1968. Inspired by his Christian beliefs and the nonviolent activism of Mahatma Gandhi, he led targeted, nonviolent resistance against Jim Crow laws and other forms of discrimination. In 1957, King and other civil rights activists founded the Southern Christian Leadership Conference (SCLC). The group was created to harness the moral authority and organizing power of black churches to conduct nonviolent protests in the service of civil rights reform. The group was inspired by the crusades of evangelist Billy Graham, who befriended King, as well as the national organizing of the group in Friendship, founded by King allies Stanley Levison and Ella Baker. King led the SCLC until his death. 
As a Christian minister, King's main influence was Jesus Christ and the Christian gospels, which he would almost always quote in his religious meetings, speeches at church, and in public discourses. King's faith was strongly based in Jesus' commandment of loving your neighbor as yourself, loving God above all, and loving your enemies, praying for them and blessing them. His nonviolent thought was also based in the injunction to turn the other cheek in the Sermon on the Mount, and Jesus' teaching of putting the sword back into its place (Matthew 26:52). In his famous "Letter from Birmingham Jail", King urged action consistent with what he describes as Jesus' "extremist" love, and also quoted numerous other Christian pacifist authors, which was very usual for him. In another sermon, he stated:Before I was a civil rights leader, I was a preacher of the Gospel. This was my first calling and it still remains my greatest commitment. You know, actually all that I do in civil rights I do because I consider it a part of my ministry. I have no other ambitions in life but to achieve excellence in the Christian ministry. I don't plan to run for any political office. I don't plan to do anything but remain a preacher. And what I'm doing in this struggle, along with many others, grows out of my feeling that the preacher must be concerned about the whole man.

Jimmy Carter 

From a young age, 39th U.S. president Jimmy Carter showed a deep commitment to Christianity. In 1942, Carter became a deacon and teaches Sunday school at Maranatha Baptist Church in Plains, Georgia. At a private inauguration worship service, the preacher was Nelson Price, the pastor of Roswell Street Baptist Church of Marietta, Georgia. During his 1966 and 1970 Georgia gubernatorial campaigns, as well as his 1976 presidential campaign, Carter appealed largely to conservative Christian and rural voters. As president, Carter prayed several times a day, and professed that Jesus was the driving force in his life. Carter had been greatly influenced by a sermon he had heard as a young man. It asked, "If you were arrested for being a Christian, would there be enough evidence to convict you?" In 2000, Carter severed his membership with the Southern Baptist Convention, saying the group's doctrines did not align with his Christian beliefs, while still a member of the Cooperative Baptist Fellowship. In 2007, together with former President Clinton, he founded the New Baptist Covenant organization for social justice.

Beliefs

Homosexuality 

The Christian left generally approaches homosexuality differently from some other Christian political groups. This approach can be driven by focusing on issues differently despite holding similar religious views, or by holding different religious ideas. Those in the Christian left who have similar ideas as other Christian political groups but a different focus may view Christian teachings on certain issues, such as the Bible's prohibitions against killing or criticisms of concentrations of wealth, as far more politically important than Christian teachings on social issues emphasized by the religious right, such as opposition to homosexuality. Others in the Christian left have not only a different focus on issues from other Christian political groups, but different religious ideas as well.

For example, some members of the Christian left may consider discrimination and bigotry against homosexuals to be immoral, but they differ on their views towards homosexual sex. Some believe homosexual sex to be immoral but unimportant compared with issues relating to social justice, or even matters of sexual morality involving heterosexual sex. Others assert that some homosexual practices are compatible with the Christian life. Such members believe common biblical arguments used to condemn homosexuality are misinterpreted, and that biblical prohibitions of homosexual practices are actually against a specific type of homosexual sex act, i.e. pederasty, the sodomizing of young boys by older men. Thus, they hold biblical prohibitions to be irrelevant when considering modern same-sex relationships.

Consistent life ethic 

A related strain of thought is the (Catholic and progressive evangelical) consistent life ethic, which sees opposition to capital punishment, militarism, euthanasia, abortion and the global unequal distribution of wealth as being related. It is an idea with certain concepts shared by Abrahamic religions as well as Buddhists, Hindus, and members of other religions. The late Cardinal Joseph Bernardin of Chicago developed the idea for the consistent life ethic in 1983. Sojourners is particularly associated with this strand of thought.

Liberation theology 

Liberation theology is a theological tradition that emerged in the developing world, primarily in Latin America. Since the 1960s, Catholic thinkers have integrated left-wing thought and Catholicism, giving rise to Liberation theology. It arose at a time when Catholic thinkers who opposed the despotic leaders in Southern and Central America allied themselves with the communist opposition. However, it developed independently of and roughly simultaneously with Black theology in the U.S. and should not be confused with it. The Congregation for the Doctrine of the Faith decided that while liberation theology is partially compatible with Catholic social teaching, certain Marxist elements of it, such as the doctrine of perpetual class struggle, are against Church teachings.

Political parties 
 Democratic Party (Italy) (Christian left factions)
 Christian Democracy (Greece)
 Christian Social Party (Switzerland) (Catholic)
 Political Party of Radicals and Evangelical People's Party (merged into the Dutch GroenLinks)
 Christian Democratic Party (Uruguay)
 Christian Democratic Party (Chile)
 Citizen Left Party (Chile)
 Sandinista National Liberation Front (Nicaragua)
 Labour Party (UK) (Christians on the Left faction, formerly the Christian Socialist Movement)
 Socialdemocrats for Faith and Solidarity (a Swedish religious organization in the Social Democrats)
Co-operative Commonwealth Federation (merged into New Democratic Party of Canada)
 American Solidarity Party (economic left)
 Prohibition Party (economic left)
 Self-Defence of the Republic of Poland (agrarian and nationalist Christian left)
 Humanist Democratic Centre (had a Christian Left faction)

Early Christianity 
 Christian anarchism
 Christian communism

Movements 
A number of movements of the past had similarities to today's Christian left:
 Anabaptists
 Fifth Monarchists, Diggers, Quakers
 Heretical movements such as the Cathars
 Liberation theology
 Lollard
 Peace churches
 German Peasants' War
 Role of Christians in the Peasants' Revolt in England, see Lollard priest John Ball
 Waldenses
 Jesus movement
 Unitarianism
 Universalism

Groups 
Catholic Worker Movement
 Christian Church (Disciples of Christ)
 Congregationalists
 Emergent Church
 Episcopal Church (United States)
 Progressive National Baptist Convention
 United Church of Christ
 Seventh-day Adventist Church

Other 
 Christian democracy
 Christian libertarianism
 Christian pacifism
 Christian politics
 Christian socialism
 Evangelical left
 Homosexuality and Christianity
 International League of Religious Socialists
 Jewish left
 Left-wing populism
 Liberal Christianity
 Pacifism
 Political Catholicism
 Progressive Christianity
 Progressive Muslim vote
 Religion and abortion
 Religious communism
 Religious socialism
 Religious Society of Friends
 Social Gospel
 Spiritual left

References

Bibliography 
 Young, Shawn David. Gray Sabbath: Jesus People USA, the Evangelical Left, and the Evolution of Christian Rock. New York: Columbia University Press, 2015.

External links 
  – Educational and interactive networking (non-partisan)
 Anglo-Catholic Socialism
 
 The Christian Leftist: The 'Religious' 'Right' Is Neither
 Religious Movements Homepage: Call to Renewal: Christians for a New Political Vision
 
 Religion and Socialism Commission of the Democratic Socialists of America
 
 Sojourners Magazine
 Social Redemption
 
 The Christian Alliance for Progress
 Known Author – discussion forum for liberal Christians
 The Bible on the Poor: Or Why God is a Liberal

Left
Christian terminology
Economic progressivism
Left-wing ideologies
Liberalism and religion